Nicolas is a French wine retailer, which also has stores in other countries.

Nicolas is a French wine specialist established in Paris in 1822 and operating in London since 1989. The first Nicolas stores were opened in Paris in 1822, and the chain has since grown to include over 400 branches throughout France, with a number of branches in the UK, Belgium, Germany and Poland. In 1988, Nicolas was bought by Groupe Castel.

Nicolas has 530 stores in total, located in major towns and cities throughout France and abroad, notably Great Britain where there are 7 branches in London. Nicolas stocks more than 1,200 wines, champagnes and other alcoholic beverages.

References

External links

 

Retailing in France
Wine retailers of the United Kingdom
Wine retailers
Food and drink companies established in 1822
Retail companies established in 1822
1822 establishments in France
Drink companies of France
French brands